The 1904 Texas gubernatorial election was held to elect the Governor of Texas. Incumbent Governor S. W. T. Lanham was re-elected to a second term over Republican J. G. Lowden.

General election

Candidates
Pat B. Clark (Populist)
W. D. Jackson (Prohibition)
Frank Leitner (Socialist Labor)
S. W. T. Lanham, incumbent Governor (Democratic)
J. G. Lowden (Republican)
Word H. Mills (Socialist)

Results

References

1904
Texas
1904 Texas elections